Old Doctor Butler's Head is a pub in Mason's Avenue, London EC2. The pub was named after the physician William Butler, a doctor at the court of James I. Butler is credited with inventing the medicinal drink Dr Butler’s purging ale, which became popular in 17th-century England.

The pub is a Grade II listed building, probably dating back to the early 19th century.

References

External links
 
 

Grade II listed pubs in the City of London